Daniel James Howell (born 11 June 1991) is an English YouTuber, presenter, comedian and author. He gained prominence through his YouTube channels Daniel Howell (formerly known as danisnotonfire), which reached over six million subscribers, and DanAndPhilGAMES. Together with frequent collaborator Phil Lester, Howell presented the Sunday night entertainment show Dan and Phil on BBC Radio 1 from January 2013 until August 2014, and the station's Internet Takeover slot from September 2014 until April 2016.

Early life
Howell grew up in Winnersh, Berkshire. He has a younger brother, Adrian, who started a YouTube channel of his own in 2018 and works as a photographer and lifestyle coach.

He worked for the retail chain Focus DIY at the age of 16 and later at the supermarket Asda. He was a member of Wokingham Youth Theatre growing up. After graduating from The Forest School in 2009, Howell took a gap year, during which he started posting videos to his channel as a hobby. He then went to the University of Manchester in 2010 to study law, but dropped out in 2011  because of a lack of interest in the subject, instead going on to pursue radio presenting and video blogging as a full-time profession.

Career

YouTube

Howell uploaded his first YouTube video titled "HELLO INTERNET" on 16 October 2009. He was encouraged by "some friends" including Phil Lester to continually upload videos to the site.

He also has a second channel, danisnotinteresting, which has over 1.7 million subscribers and 72 million views, as of September 2020. He has broadcast weekly hour-long live shows on this channel, as well as on YouNow.

Howell and Lester collaborated on a YouTube channel for My Damn Channel, entitled The Super Amazing Project, in which they investigated paranormal events. In October 2014, it was announced that as of that month, the duo would not carry on working on the project, in order to concentrate on their Radio 1 show. It was later announced that the Super Amazing Project would continue production, but hosted by different presenters, Alastair James Murder and Victoria Atkin, scouted by the My Damn Channel network.

In 2012, he won the YouTube competition "SuperNote" run by Rhett and Link. He also featured in the weekly video series, Becoming YouTube by Benjamin Cook, which looked at the different aspects to becoming an internet celebrity. He also wrote a blog for The Huffington Post about the creative process behind making his videos.

On 12 September 2014, Howell and Lester posted the first video on their new gaming YouTube channel, DanAndPhilGAMES. On 8 March 2015 the channel hit 1 million subscribers. It was officially the fastest growing channel on YouTube. DanAndPhilGAMES reached over 3.1 million subscribers. Popular recurring and annual series on this channel include their Sims 4 series, Spooky Week, and Gamingmas. As of the most recent upload in December 2018, the channel is on an indefinite hiatus.

On 1 April 2015, Howell and Lester launched a spin-off channel DanAndPhilCRAFTS as an April Fools joke. It features a single video of them creating square snowflakes out of paper, with an amateur editing style and humour throughout. It reached over 154,000 subscribers and 500,000 total video views in one week. "Don't cry, craft" became a popular Internet meme from that video, described by the Standard-Examiner as "one of the best known YouTube phrases of all time". The channel was awarded the YouTube Silver Play Button at Summer in the City 2015. On 1 April 2016, Howell and Lester made a second video for that channel in which they did another joke tutorial, this time on making glitter faces. In 2017, a third and final video to end the trilogy, titled "Potato Prints" was uploaded.

On 1 May 2017, Howell posted a video on his channel stating that he had changed the name of his YouTube channel from danisnotonfire to Daniel Howell, after stating issues arising from the danisnotonfire name.

Radio

In January 2013, Howell and Lester became the presenters of BBC Radio 1's Sunday evening entertainment and request show. They had occasionally worked with the station before, producing videos for the station's YouTube channel for Edinburgh Festival Fringe and presenting two Christmas broadcasts. The show was designed to be interactive with the audience, featuring amateur music videos from listeners, challenges performed on air by the presenters, and song requests. Four months after starting the show, it won the Sony Golden Headphones award.

Howell and Lester presented at the Teen Awards in 2013 and 2014, as part of the BBC online coverage and their Radio 1 show.

In August 2014, it was announced that the last Dan and Phil show would be broadcast on 24 August, with the duo moving to a different show on Monday nights, featuring other popular video bloggers. This new show was titled The Internet Takeover, and featured Howell along with Lester live on the first Monday of every month, before coming to an end in April 2016.

Television and film
In 2013 Lester and Howell appeared on Friday Download, a BAFTA award-winning CBBC TV show.

From 2014 to 2016, Howell and Lester hosted the worldwide YouTube livestream of the Brit Awards as well as making backstage videos for their channel.

In 2015, Howell, along with Lester, had voice cameo appearances in the UK cinema release of Walt Disney Animation Studios' Big Hero 6 as Technician 1 & 2. However, this version is not in the UK home release. That same year, the duo also guest-starred in fellow YouTuber PJ Liguori's web series Oscar's Hotel for Fantastical Creatures, voicing anthropomorphic food items Brie and Rash.

On 2 February 2016, his BBC Three eSports documentary The Supergamers aired.

In December 2016, Howell and Lester voiced two gorilla princes named Majinuni and Hafifu respectively, in the episode "The Lost Gorillas" in Disney Junior's The Lion Guard.

IRL Merch
In 2014, Lester's brother, Martyn, and Howell co-founded IRL Digital, Ltd., a company that creates and sells the merchandise of various other media personalities.

Games
In August 2015, Howell and Lester created an app, The 7 Second Challenge, based on a YouTube challenge started by Lester in a 2014 video on his main channel. The app was discontinued in 2019. In October 2017, the duo released a party board game via Big Potato, Truth Bombs, also the brainchild of Lester.

The Amazing Book Is Not on Fire and The Amazing Tour Is Not on Fire
On 26 March 2015, Lester and Howell announced via a trailer on Howell's channel that they had co-written a book titled The Amazing Book Is Not on Fire (TABINOF). It was released in the UK on 8 October 2015 and worldwide on 15 October 2015, published by Ebury Press and Random House Children's Books. The book topped the General Hardbacks Sunday Times Bestsellers list having sold 26,745 copies in the UK in the first week of its release. It also became a #1 New York Times Bestseller in the young adult hardcover list.

In the same trailer the pair announced their theatrical stage show The Amazing Tour Is Not on Fire (TATINOF) which travelled around the UK during October and November 2015, ending with a show at the London Palladium. During the tour, they sung original song "The Internet Is Here", which they later released as a charity single for Stand Up To Cancer, earning them a gold record disc for the sales of the song.

In 2016, they took the tour to the US and Toronto, starting with a show in Orlando, Florida on 22 April and ended on 24 June with a show at the Dolby Theatre in Hollywood, California. It was the largest tour ever achieved by YouTube creators. They later toured Australia in August 2016, starting in Perth and ending in Brisbane, and finished the tour with a European leg, performing in Stockholm, Berlin, and Dublin.

YouTube Red Originals and Dan and Phil Go Outside 
In October 2016, The Amazing Tour Is Not on Fire was released as a YouTube Red Original film by the same name along with a documentary, Dan and Phil's Story of TATINOF. They are the first British YouTube creators to release content on the YouTube Red platform.

Alongside these films, they released a photo book, Dan and Phil Go Outside, in November 2016, which includes a personal collection of candid photos and insightful stories from the tour. The book became a #1 New York Times bestseller.

Interactive Introverts 
In November 2017, Lester and Howell announced their second tour, Interactive Introverts, a world tour that would take place in 2018.  The tour ran from April, starting in Brighton, to September, ending in Mumbai, and included 80 shows in 18 countries, including but not limited to Poland, the Philippines, Russia, New Zealand, Finland, and the Netherlands, making it one of the biggest YouTuber tours of all time.

Lester and Howell partnered with BBC Studios' TalentWorks to release a movie of Interactive Introverts with bonus features, such as behind the scenes content and director's commentary, on DVD, Blu-ray, and available for digital download in December 2018.

You Will Get Through This Night
In September 2020, Howell announced his first solo publication, You Will Get Through This Night. Written in conjunction with psychologist Dr Heather Bolton, the book is "A practical guide to taking control of your mental health for today, tomorrow, and the days after." The book was released 18 May 2021 under the HQ and Dey Street Books imprints of HarperCollins. It became a #1 Sunday Times Bestseller.

Personal life
Howell and Phil Lester met on the Internet in 2009 and in person that October. They have lived together since August 2011, first in Manchester before moving to London in July 2012. In 2019, Howell revealed that the two have been romantically involved but refrained from discussing their current relationship, stating "I'm somebody that wants to keep the details of my personal life private. So is Phil."

In October 2017, Howell posted a video, "Daniel and Depression", in which he revealed that he had suffered from clinical depression. He also spoke of his journey to recovery, which involved taking antidepressants, seeing a therapist, and focusing on "basic self-care". Howell uploaded the video one day after World Mental Health Day, in which he and Lester supported #HelloYellow, a mental health campaign by UK-based YoungMinds, prompting the organisation to name Howell their newest ambassador. That same year, Howell supported and became involved in Stop, Speak, Support, an anti-cyberbullying campaign launched by Prince William.

Following a hiatus from YouTube, in June 2019 Howell came out as queer and gay in a video uploaded on his channel; he also said that he does not "feel the need to use labels." He discussed external and internalized homophobia he dealt with over the course of his life, particularly in school, to the point of a suicide attempt when he was a teenager. He came out to his family earlier that month over email.

Bibliography
The Amazing Book Is Not on Fire (2015), co-written with Phil Lester
Dan and Phil Go Outside (2016), co-written with Phil Lester
You Will Get Through This Night (2021)

Awards and nominations

See also
Dan and Phil

References

External links 
 
 The Internet Takeover
 

1991 births
BBC Radio 1 presenters
Dan and Phil
English company founders
English male non-fiction writers
English radio DJs
English self-help writers
English video bloggers
English YouTubers
Gaming YouTubers
Gay entertainers
British gay writers
Living people
English LGBT entertainers
English LGBT writers
LGBT YouTubers
Mental health activists
People from Bracknell
People from Winnersh
People from Wokingham
Queer men
Writers from Berkshire